Christmas All Over the World is a holiday EP by the American R&B group New Edition. It was released in December 1985 by MCA Records. It was the group's only Christmas release. The EP was the final release to feature vocals from original member Bobby Brown, who was kicked out of the group after its release. The group reluctantly forced him out due to managerial concern of the group's image being tattered by Brown's multiple outbursts and erratic behavior due to his drug usage. Brown also intentionally missed several important rehearsal and performance dates that hurt the group's image. Brown would return for their sixth album, Home Again (1996).

The EP was a moderate chart success, peaking at number forty-five on the Billboard R&B Albums chart, and received mediocre reviews from most music critics.

Track listing

Personnel
Ricky Bell – vocals, arranger, producer
Michael Bivins – vocals, arranger, producer
Bobby Brown – vocals
Ronnie DeVoe – vocals, arranger, producer
Ralph Tresvant – vocals, arranger, producer, drums

Charts

References

External links
 New Edition-Christmas All Over the World at Discogs

New Edition albums
MCA Records albums
1985 Christmas albums
Christmas albums by American artists
Contemporary R&B Christmas albums